The men's 50 metre rifle, prone was a shooting sports event held as part of the Shooting at the 1984 Summer Olympics programme. The competition was held on July 30, 1984, at the shooting ranges in Los Angeles. 71 shooters from 46 nations competed.

Results

References

Shooting at the 1984 Summer Olympics
Men's 050m prone 1984
Men's events at the 1984 Summer Olympics